The Baltimore Orioles entered the 2008 season led by Dave Trembley, now starting his first full season as manager. President of Baseball Operations Andy MacPhail continued the rebuilding process. Superstars Miguel Tejada and Érik Bédard were traded for younger talent and there were talks of Brian Roberts, but he was not traded.

The Baltimore Orioles posted a record of 68–93 and finished in last place in the AL East for the first time since the 1988 season.

Closer Chris Ray missed the entire season after Tommy John surgery, and so did his replacement Danys Báez. Left-hander George Sherrill, acquired from the Mariners, was named the team's closer for the 2008 season and became the lone representative for the 2008 Major League Baseball All-Star Game, while Jeremy Guthrie was the Opening Day starter after an impressive rookie season and several solid spring training outings.

Offseason

Transactions
On December 12, 2007 the Orioles traded shortstop Miguel Tejada to the Houston Astros for outfielder Luke Scott, pitchers Matt Albers, Troy Patton, Dennis Sarfate and third baseman Mike Costanzo.
On February 8, 2008 the Orioles traded left-handed pitcher Érik Bédard to the Seattle Mariners for outfielder Adam Jones, pitchers George Sherrill, Chris Tillman, Tony Butler and Kam Mickolio.

New coaches
Rick Kranitz – Orioles pitching coach
John Shelby – Orioles 1st base coach

Regular season

Roster

Season standings

Record vs. opponents

Game log

|- align="center" bgcolor="ffbbbb"
| 1 || March 31 || 3:05pm || Rays || 6 – 2 || Shields (1-0) || Guthrie (0-1) ||  || 46,807 || 0-1
|-

|- align="center" bgcolor="bbffbb"
| 2 || April 2 || 7:05pm || Rays || 9 – 6 || Walker (1-0) || Reyes (0-1) || Sherrill (1) || 10,505 || 1-1
|- align="center" bgcolor="bbbbbb"
| – || April 3 || 7:05pm || Rays || colspan=6|Postponed (rain) Rescheduled for September 23
|- align="center" bgcolor="bbffbb"
| 3 || April 4 || 7:05pm || Mariners || 7 – 4 || Trachsel (1-0) || Washburn (0-1) || Sherrill (2) || 14,429 || 2-1
|- align="center" bgcolor="bbffbb"
| 4 || April 5 || 7:05pm || Mariners || 6 – 4 || Albers (1-0) || Batista (0-1) || Sherrill (3) || 24,824 || 3-1
|- align="center" bgcolor="bbffbb"
| 5 || April 6 || 1:35pm || Mariners || 3 – 2 || Sarfate (1-0) || Lowe (0-1) || || 19,215 || 4-1
|- align="center" bgcolor="bbffbb"
| 6 || April 7 || 3:05pm || Mariners || 5 – 4 || Sarfate (2-0) || O'Flaherty (0-1) || Sherrill (4) || 10,774 || 5-1
|- align="center" bgcolor="bbffbb"
| 7 || April 8 || 2:05pm || @ Rangers || 8 – 1 || Burres (1-0) || Jennings (0-2) || || 48,808 || 6-1
|- align="center" bgcolor="bbbbbb"
| – || April 9 || 8:05pm || @ Rangers || colspan=6|Postponed (rain) Rescheduled for April 10
|- align="center" bgcolor="ffbbbb"
| 8 || April 10 || 5:05pm || @ Rangers || 3 – 1 || Millwood (1-2) || Trachsel (1-1) || Wilson (2) || – || 6-2
|- align="center" bgcolor="ffbbbb"
| 9 || April 10 || 8:05pm || @ Rangers || 5 – 4 || Wright (1-0) || Bradford (0-1) || Wilson (3) || 15,560 || 6-3
|- align="center" bgcolor="ffbbbb"
| 10 || April 11 || 7:10pm || @ Rays || 10 – 5 || Reyes (1-1) || Sarfate (2-1) ||  || 12,146 || 6-4
|- align="center" bgcolor="bbffbb"
| 11 || April 12 || 7:10pm || @ Rays || 3 – 2 || Bradford (1-1) || Wheeler (0-1) || Sherrill (5) || 19,295 || 7-4
|- align="center" bgcolor="ffbbbb"
| 12 || April 13 || 1:40pm || @ Rays || 6 – 2 || Niemann (1-0) || Burres (1-1) || || 16,748 || 7-5
|- align="center" bgcolor="bbffbb"
| 13 || April 14 || 7:05pm || Blue Jays || 4 – 3 || Albers (2-0) || McGowan (0-1) || Sherrill (6) || 11,510 || 8-5
|- align="center" bgcolor="ffbbbb"
| 14 || April 15 || 7:05pm || Blue Jays || 11 – 3 || Marcum (2-0) || Trachsel (1-2) || || 15,017 || 8-6
|- align="center" bgcolor="ffbbbb"
| 15 || April 16 || 7:05pm || White Sox || 3 – 1 || Contreras (1-1) || Loewen (0-1) || Jenks (6) || 12,080 || 8-7
|- align="center" bgcolor="bbffbb"
| 16 || April 17 || 7:05pm || White Sox  || 6 – 5 (10) || Sherrill (1-0)|| Logan (1-1)|| || 13,676 || 9-7
|- align="center" bgcolor="bbffbb"
| 17 || April 18 || 7:05pm || Yankees || 8 – 2 || Cabrera (1-0) || Hughes (0-3) || || 40,653 || 10-7
|- align="center" bgcolor="bbffbb"
| 18 || April 19 || 7:05pm || Yankees || 6 – 0 || Burres (2-1) || Kennedy (0-2) || Johnson (1)  || 41,776 || 11-7
|- align="center" bgcolor="ffbbbb"
| 19 || April 20 || 1:35pm || Yankees || 7 – 1 || Pettitte (3-1) || Trachsel (1-3) || || 37,501 || 11-8
|- align="center" bgcolor="ffbbbb"
| 20 || April 22 || 10:10pm || @ Mariners || 4 – 2 || Rhodes (1-0) || Guthrie (0-2) || Putz (2) || 17,780 || 11-9
|- align="center" bgcolor="bbffbb"
| 21 || April 23 || 10:10pm || @ Mariners || 3 – 2 || Cabrera (2-0) || Rowland-Smith (0-1) || Sherrill (7) || 16,823 || 12-9
|- align="center" bgcolor="bbffbb"
| 22 || April 24 || 10:10pm || @ Mariners || 8 – 7 || Bradford (2-1) || Green (1-1) || Sherrill (8) || 16,727 || 13-9
|- align="center" bgcolor="bbbbbb"
| – || April 25 || 8:11pm || @ White Sox || colspan=6|Postponed (rain) Rescheduled for April 26
|- align="center" bgcolor="bbffbb"
| 23 || April 26 || 1:05pm || @ White Sox || 5 – 1 || Burres (3-1) || Danks (2-2) || Sherrill (9) || 23,043 || 14-9
|- align="center" bgcolor="ffbbbb"
| 24 || April 26 || 7:05pm || @ White Sox || 6 – 5 || Jenks (2-0) || Bierd (0-1) || || 34,757 || 14-10
|- align="center" bgcolor="ffbbbb"
| 25 || April 27 || 2:05pm || @ White Sox || 6 – 1 || Contreras (2-2) || Guthrie (0-3) || || 29,756 || 14-11
|- align="center" bgcolor="bbbbbb"
| -- || April 28 || 2:05pm || @ White Sox ||colspan=6|Suspended (rain) To be completed on August 25
|- align="center" bgcolor="bbffbb"
| 26 || April 29 || 7:05pm || Rays || 7 – 4 || Olson (1-0) || Hammel (2-2) || Sherrill (10) || 11,588 || 15-11
|- align="center" bgcolor="ffbbbb"
| 27 || April 30 || 7:05pm || Rays || 8 – 1 || Sonnanstine  (4-1) || Albers (2-1) || || 11,944 || 15-12
|-

|- align="center" bgcolor="ffbbbb"
| 28 || May 1 || 12:35pm || Rays || 4 – 2 || Garza (1-0) || Burres (3-2) || Percival (6) || 16,456 || 15-13
|- align="center" bgcolor="bbffbb"
| 29 || May 2 || 10:05pm || @ Angels || 4 – 3 || Guthrie (1-3) || Weaver (2-4) || Sherrill (11) || 41,515 || 16-13
|- align="center" bgcolor="ffbbbb"
| 30 || May 3 || 3:45pm || @ Angels || 3 – 1 || Garland (4-3) || Cabrera (2-1) || Rodríguez (12) || 37,601 || 16-14
|- align="center" bgcolor="ffbbbb"
| 31 || May 4 || 3:35pm || @ Angels || 6 – 5 || Saunders (6-0) || Trachsel (1-4) || Rodríguez (13) || 39,273 || 16-15
|- align="center" bgcolor="ffbbbb"
| 32 || May 5 || 10:05pm || @ Athletics || 2 – 1 || Devine (3-0) || Johnson (0-1) || || 10,128 || 16-16
|- align="center" bgcolor="ffbbbb"
| 33 || May 6 || 10:05pm || @ Athletics || 4 – 2 || Duchscherer (3-1) || Burres (3-3) || Casilla (1) || 11,492 || 16-17
|- align="center" bgcolor="ffbbbb"
| 34 || May 7 || 3:35pm || @ Athletics || 6 – 5 || Braden (1-0) || Cormier (0-1) || || 15,235 || 16-18
|- align="center" bgcolor="bbffbb"
| 35 || May 8 || 8:10pm || @ Royals || 4 – 1 || Cabrera (3-1) || Hochevar (2-2) || || 11,781 || 17-18
|- align="center" bgcolor="bbffbb"
| 36 || May 9 || 8:10pm || @ Royals || 7 – 4 || Trachsel (2-4) || Meche (2-4) || Sherrill (12) || 21,873 || 18-18
|- align="center" bgcolor="bbffbb"
| 37 || May 10 || 7:10pm || @ Royals || 6 – 5 || Olson (2-0) || Tomko (1-4) || Sherrill (13) || 15,808 || 19-18
|- align="center" bgcolor="ffbbbb"
| 38 || May 11 || 2:10pm || @ Royals || 4 – 0 || Bannister (4-4) || Burres (3-4) || || 18,635 || 19-19
|- align="center" bgcolor="bbffbb"
| 39 || May 13 || 7:05pm || Red Sox || 5 – 4 || Guthrie (2-3)|| Beckett (4-3) || Sherrill (14) || 38,768 || 20-19
|- align="center" bgcolor="bbffbb"
| 40 || May 14 || 3:05pm || Red Sox || 6 – 3 || Cabrera (4-1) || Hansen (0-2) || Sherrill (15) || 28,939 || 21-19
|- align="center" bgcolor="bbffbb"
| 41 || May 16 || 7:05pm || Nationals || 5 – 3 || Olson (3-0) || Hill (0-1) || Sherrill (16) || 29,266 || 22-19
|- align="center" bgcolor="bbffbb"
| 42 || May 17 || 7:05pm || Nationals || 6 – 5 || Burres (4-4) || Pérez (1-4) || Sherrill (17) || 32,662 || 23-19
|- align="center" bgcolor="ffbbbb"
| 43 || May 18 || 1:35pm || Nationals || 2 – 1 || Lannan (4-4) || Guthrie (2-4) || Rauch (10) || 33,745 || 23-20
|- align="center" bgcolor="bbffbb"
| 44 || May 20 || 7:05pm || @ Yankees || 12 – 2 || Cabrera (5-1) || Mussina (6-4) || || 51,617 || 24-20
|- align="center" bgcolor="ffbbbb"
| 45 || May 21 || 7:05pm || @ Yankees || 8 – 0 || Rasner (3-0) || Olson (3-1) || || 50,682 || 24-21
|- align="center" bgcolor="ffbbbb"
| 46 || May 22 || 7:05pm || @ Yankees || 2 – 1 || Rivera (2-1) || Johnson (0-2) || || 49,452 || 24-22
|- align="center" bgcolor="ffbbbb"
| 47 || May 23 || 7:10pm || @ Rays || 2 – 0 || Garza (3-1) || Guthrie (2-5) || Percival (14) || 13,635 || 24-23
|- align="center" bgcolor="ffbbbb"
| 48 || May 24 || 6:10pm || @ Rays || 11 – 4 || Jackson (3-3) || Trachsel (2-5) || ||  30,445 || 24-24
|- align="center" bgcolor="ffbbbb"
| 49 || May 25 || 1:40pm || @ Rays || 5 – 4 || Percival (1-0) || Sherrill (1-1) || || 17,762 || 24-25
|- align="center" bgcolor="bbffbb"
| 50 || May 26 || 1:35pm || Yankees || 6 – 1 || Olson (4-1) || Rasner (3-1) || || 34,928 || 25-25
|- align="center" bgcolor="bbffbb"
| 51 || May 27 || 7:05pm || Yankees || 10 – 9 || Albers (3-1) || Hawkins (1-1) || || 24,030 || 26-25
|- align="center" bgcolor="ffbbbb"
| 52 || May 28 || 7:05pm || Yankees || 4 – 2 || Pettitte (5-5)|| Guthrie (2-6) || Rivera (13) || 24,791 || 26-26
|- align="center" bgcolor="ffbbbb"
| 53 || May 30 || 7:05pm || Red Sox || 5 – 2 (13) || Timlin (3-3) || Bradford (2-2) || Papelbon (15) || 46,199 || 26-27
|- align="center" bgcolor="ffbbbb"
| 54 || May 31 || 7:05pm || Red Sox || 6 – 3 || Aardsma (2-1) || Cormier (0-2) || Papelbon (16) || 48,281 || 26-28
|-

|- align="center" bgcolor="ffbbbb"
| 55 || June 1 || 1:35pm || Red Sox || 9 – 4 || Colón (3-0) || Burres (4-5) || || 45,031 || 26-29
|- align="center" bgcolor="bbffbb"
| 56 || June 2 || 7:05pm || Red Sox || 6 – 3 || Johnson (1-2) || Okajima (1-1) || Sherrill (18) || 25,711 || 27-29
|- align="center" bgcolor="bbffbb"
| 57 || June 3 || 8:10pm || @ Twins || 5 – 3 || Liz (1-0) || Slowey (2-5) || Sherrill (19) || 18,802 || 28-29
|- align="center" bgcolor="ffbbbb"
| 58 || June 4 || 8:10pm || @ Twins || 7 – 5 || Bonser (3-6)|| Cabrera (5-2) || Nathan (16) || 22,057 || 28-30
|- align="center" bgcolor="bbffbb"
| 59 || June 5 || 1:10pm || @ Twins || 3 – 2 || Olson (5-1) || Baker (2-1) || Sherrill (20) || 19,621 || 29-30
|- align="center" bgcolor="bbffbb"
| 60 || June 6 || 7:07pm || @ Blue Jays || 6 – 5 || Sarfate (3-1) || Benítez (0-1) || Sherrill (21) || 23,649 || 30-30
|- align="center" bgcolor="bbffbb"
| 61 || June 7 || 1:07pm || @ Blue Jays || 9 – 5 || Guthrie (3-6) || Burnett (5-6) ||  || 25,122 || 31-30
|- align="center" bgcolor="ffbbbb"
| 62 || June 8 || 1:07pm || @ Blue Jays || 5 – 4 || Halladay (8-5) || Albers (3-2) || Ryan (13) || 25,365 || 31-31
|- align="center" bgcolor="bbffbb"
| 63 || June 10 || 7:05pm || @ Red Sox || 10 – 6 || Sarfate (4-1) || Okajima (1-2) || || 37,858 || 32-31
|- align="center" bgcolor="ffbbbb"
| 64 || June 11 || 7:05pm || @ Red Sox || 6 – 3 || Colón (4-1) || Olson (5-2) || Papelbon (19) || 38,130 || 32-32
|- align="center" bgcolor="ffbbbb"
| 65 || June 12 || 7:05pm || @ Red Sox || 9 – 2 || Lester (5-3) || Guthrie (3-7) || || 38,139 || 32-33
|- align="center" bgcolor="bbffbb"
| 66 || June 13 || 7:05pm || Pirates || 9 – 6 || Burres (5-5) || Osoria (3-2) || Sherrill (22) || 47,305 || 33-33
|- align="center" bgcolor="bbffbb"
| 67 || June 14 || 7:05pm || Pirates || 8 – 7 || Sherrill (2-1) || Capps (0-2) || || 32,432 || 34-33
|- align="center" bgcolor="ffbbbb"
| 68 || June 15 || 1:35pm || Pirates || 5 – 4 || Capps (1-2) || Sherrill (2-2) || || 31,107 || 34-34
|- align="center" bgcolor="bbffbb"
| 69 || June 17 || 7:05pm || Astros || 6 – 5 || Johnson (2-2) || Brocail (2-2) || Sherrill (23) || 21,535 || 35-34
|- align="center" bgcolor="bbffbb"
| 70 || June 18 || 7:05pm || Astros || 2 – 1 || Bradford (3-2) || Valverde (4-2) || || 21,112 ||36-34
|- align="center" bgcolor="bbffbb"
| 71 || June 19 || 7:05pm || Astros || 7 – 5 || Burres (6-5) || Chacón (2-3) || Sherrill (24) || 31,480 || 37-34
|- align="center" bgcolor="bbffbb"
| 72 || June 20 || 8:05pm || @ Brewers || 8 – 5 || Cormier (1-2) || Suppan (4-5) || Sherrill (25) || 36,526 || 38-34
|- align="center" bgcolor="ffbbbb"
| 73 || June 21 || 7:05pm || @ Brewers || 3 – 2 || McClung (5-3) || Cabrera (5-3) || Torres (11) || 42,521 || 38-35
|- align="center" bgcolor="ffbbbb"
| 74 || June 22 || 2:05pm || @ Brewers || 7 – 3 || Parra (7-2) || Olson (5-3) || Torres (12) || 43,517 || 38-36
|- align="center" bgcolor="bbffbb"
| 75 || June 24 || 8:05pm || @ Cubs || 7 – 5 || Guthrie (4-7) || Marshall (0-1) || Sherrill (26) || 41,537 || 39-36
|- align="center" bgcolor="ffbbbb"
| 76 || June 25 || 8:05pm || @ Cubs || 7 – 4 || Lilly (8-5) || Albers (3-3) || Wood (20) || 40,754 || 39-37
|- align="center" bgcolor="bbffbb"
| 77 || June 26 || 2:20pm || @ Cubs || 11 – 4 || Liz (2-0) || Marquis (6-4) || || 41,670 || 40-37
|- align="center" bgcolor="ffbbbb"
| 78 || June 27 || 7:35pm || @ Nationals || 4 – 2 || Hanrahan (4-2) || Cabrera (5-4) || Rauch (16) || 35,830 || 40-38
|- align="center" bgcolor="bbffbb"
| 79 || June 28 || 7:10pm || @ Nationals || 9 – 1 || Olson (6-3) || Lannan (4-9) || Cormier (1) || 39,479 || 41-38
|- align="center" bgcolor="ffbbbb"
| 80 || June 29 || 1:35pm || @ Nationals || 3 – 2 (12) || Hanrahan (5-2) || Sherrill (2-3) || || 39,824 || 41-39
|- align="center" bgcolor="ffbbbb"
| 81 || June 30 || 7:05pm || Royals || 6 – 5  (11)  || Mahay (4-0) || Bradford (3-3) || Soria (22) || 15,289 || 41-40
|-

|- align="center" bgcolor="bbffbb"
| 82 || July 1 || 7:05pm || Royals || 7 – 5 || Liz (3-0) || Hochevar (5-6) || Sherrill (27) || 19,756 || 42-40
|- align="center" bgcolor="bbffbb"
| 83 || July 2 || 7:05pm || Royals || 5 – 2 || Cabrera (6-4) || Meche (6-9) || || 17,909 || 43-40
|- align="center" bgcolor="ffbbbb"
| 84 || July 3 || 7:05pm || Royals || 10 – 7 || Peralta (1-2) || Loewen (0-2) || Soria (23) || 16,782 || 43-41
|- align="center" bgcolor="bbffbb"
| 85 || July 4 || 4:35pm || Rangers || 10 – 4 || Guthrie (5-7) || Padilla (10-5) ||  || 21,363 || 44-41
|- align="center" bgcolor="ffbbbb"
| 86 || July 5 || 7:05pm || Rangers || 5 – 3 || Feldman (3-3) || Cormier (1-3) || Wilson (20) || 19,006 || 44-42
|- align="center" bgcolor="ffbbbb"
| 87 || July 6 || 1:35pm || Rangers || 11 – 10 || Millwood (6-4) || Liz (3-1) || Wilson (21) || 22,276 || 44-43
|- align="center" bgcolor="ffbbbb"
| 88 || July 8 || 7:07pm || @ Blue Jays || 7 – 6 || Ryan (2-3) || Johnson (2-3) || || 23,276 || 44-44
|- align="center" bgcolor="ffbbbb"
| 89 || July 9 || 7:07pm || @ Blue Jays || 9 – 8 || Burnett (9-8) || Olson (6-4) || Ryan (17) || 22,365 || 44-45
|- align="center" bgcolor="ffbbbb"
| 90 || July 10 || 7:07pm || @ Blue Jays || 6 – 5 || Camp (2-1) || Sherrill (2-4) || || 22,279 || 44-46
|- align="center" bgcolor="bbffbb"
| 91 || July 11 || 7:05pm || @ Red Sox || 7 – 3 || Burres (7-5) || Buchholz (2-4) || Sherrill (28) || 37,779 || 45-46
|- align="center" bgcolor="ffbbbb"
| 92 || July 12 || 7:05pm || @ Red Sox || 12 – 1 || Wakefield (6-6) || Liz (3-2) || || 37,539 || 45-47
|- align="center" bgcolor="ffbbbb"
| 93 || July 13 || 1:35pm || @ Red Sox || 2 – 1 || Matsuzaka (10-1) || Cabrera (6-5) || Papelbon (28) || 37,344 || 45-48
|-
|align="center" colspan="10" style="background:#bbbbff"|All-Star Break
|-  align="center" bgcolor="ffbbbb"
| 94 || July 17 || 7:05pm || Tigers || 6 – 5 || Rogers (7–6) || Olson (6-5) || Jones (18) || 23,224 || 45-49
|- align="center" bgcolor="bbffbb"
| 95 || July 18 || 7:05pm || Tigers || 7 – 4 || Guthrie (6-7) || Galarraga (7-4) || Sherrill (29) || 29,111 || 46-49
|- align="center" bgcolor="bbffbb"
| 96 || July 19 || 7:05pm || Tigers || 11 – 10 (10) || Sherrill (3-4) || Dolsi (1-4) || || 31,525 || 47-49
|- align="center" bgcolor="ffbbbb"
| 97 || July 20 || 1:35pm || Tigers || 5 – 1 || Verlander (8-9) || Burres (7-6) || || 23,278 || 47-50
|- align="center" bgcolor="bbffbb"
| 98 || July 21 || 7:05pm || Blue Jays || 8 – 3 || Liz (4-2) || Litsch (8-7) || || 12,772 || 48-50
|- align="center" bgcolor="ffbbbb"
| 99 || July 22 || 7:05pm || Blue Jays || 10 – 8 || Carlson (2-1)|| Cabrera (0-1) || Ryan (19) || 15,184 || 48-51
|- align="center" bgcolor="ffbbbb"
| 100 || July 23 || 7:05pm || Blue Jays || 5 – 1 || Burnett (11-9) || Guthrie (6-8) || || || 48-52
|- align="center" bgcolor="ffbbbb"
| 101 || July 24 || 12:35pm || Blue Jays || 7 – 1 || Halladay (12-7) || Cabrera (6-6) || || 23,329 || 48-53
|- align="center" bgcolor="ffbbbb"
| 102 || July 25 || 7:05pm || Angels || 6 – 5 || Saunders (13-5) || Burres (7-7) || Rodríguez (43) || 27,999 || 48-54
|- align="center" bgcolor="ffbbbb"
| 103 || July 26 || 7:05pm || Angels || 11 – 6 || Garland (9-6) || Liz (4-3) || || 21,819 || 48-55
|- align="center" bgcolor="bbffbb"
| 104 || July 27 || 1:35pm || Angels || 5 – 2 || Olson (7-5) || Santana (11-5) || Sherrill (30) || 23,365 || 49-55
|- align="center" bgcolor="bbffbb"
| 105 || July 28 || 7:05pm || @ Yankees || 13 – 4 || Guthrie (7-8) || Mussina (13-7) || || 54,120 || 50-55
|- align="center" bgcolor="bbffbb"
| 106 || July 29 || 7:05pm || @ Yankees || 7 – 6 || Cabrera (7-6) || Rasner (5-8) ||  || 54,241 || 51-55
|- align="center" bgcolor="ffbbbb"
| 107 || July 30 || 1:05pm || @ Yankees || 13 – 3 || Chamberlain (4-3) || Sarfate (4-2) ||  || 54,296 || 51-56
|-

|- align="center" bgcolor="bbffbb"
| 108 || August 1 || 10:10pm || @ Mariners || 10 – 5 || Olson (8-5) || Washburn (5-10) ||  || 28,114 || 52-56
|- align="center" bgcolor="bbffbb"
| 109 || August 2 || 10:10pm || @ Mariners || 3 – 1 || Guthrie (8-8) || Hernández (7-7) || || 30,502 || 53-56
|- align="center" bgcolor="ffbbbb"
| 110 || August 3 || 4:10pm || @ Mariners || 8 – 4 || Putz (3-4) || Cabrera (7-7) || || 33,334 || 53-57
|- align="center" bgcolor="ffbbbb"
| 111 || August 4 || 10:05pm || @ Angels || 6 – 5 || Rodríguez (1-2) || Sherrill (3-5) || || 41,902 || 53-58
|- align="center" bgcolor="bbffbb"
| 112 || August 5 || 10:05pm || @ Angels || 3 – 0 || Waters (1-0) || Garland (10-7) || Sherrill (31) || 44,027 || 54-58
|- align="center" bgcolor="ffbbbb"
| 113 || August 6 || 3:35pm || @ Angels || 9 – 4 || Santana (13-5) || Olson (8-6) || || 40,130 || 54-59
|- align="center" bgcolor="bbffbb"
| 114 || August 8 || 7:05pm || Rangers || 9 – 1 || Guthrie (9-8) || Mendoza (3-5) || || 33,351 || 55-59
|- align="center" bgcolor="bbffbb"
| 115 || August 9 || 7:05pm || Rangers || 9 – 0 || Cabrera (8-7) || Padilla (12-6) || || 30,914 || 56-59
|- align="center" bgcolor="ffbbbb"
| 116 || August 10 || 1:35pm || Rangers || 15 – 7 || Harrison (4-2) || Bierd (0-2) || || 26,878 || 56-60
|- align="center" bgcolor="ffbbbb"
| 117 || August 11 || 7:05pm || @ Indians || 13 – 8 || Mujica (1-1) || Cherry (0-1) || || 23,408 || 56-61
|- align="center" bgcolor="ffbbbb"
| 118 || August 12 || 7:05pm || @ Indians || 7 – 5 || Pérez (2-2) || Johnson (2-4) || Lewis (2) || 21,143 || 56-62
|- align="center" bgcolor="bbffbb"
| 119 || August 13 || 7:05pm || @ Indians || 6 – 1 || Guthrie (10-8) || Reyes (3-2) || || 21,299 || 57-62
|- align="center" bgcolor="bbffbb"
| 120 || August 14 || 7:05pm || @ Indians || 11 – 6 || Cabrera (1-1) || Pérez (2-3) || || 22,140 || 58-62
|- align="center" bgcolor="bbffbb"
| 121 || August 15 || 7:05pm || @ Tigers || 11 – 2 || Cormier (2-3) || Robertson (7-9) || || 40,546 || 59-62
|- align="center" bgcolor="ffbbbb"
| 122 || August 16 || 7:05pm || @ Tigers || 5 – 3 || Verlander (9-13) || Sarfate (4-3) || Rodney (4) || 41,727 || 59-63
|- align="center" bgcolor="bbffbb"
| 123 || August 17 || 1:05pm || @ Tigers || 16 – 8 || Cabrera (2-1) || Fossum (2-1) || || 40,586 || 60-63
|- align="center" bgcolor="ffbbbb"
| 124 || August 18 || 7:05pm || Red Sox || 6 – 3 || Lester (12-4) || Guthrie (10-9) || Papelbon (33) || 40,429 || 60-64
|- align="center" bgcolor="ffbbbb"
| 125 || August 19 || 7:05pm || Red Sox || 7 – 2 || Matsuzaka (15-2) || Cabrera (8-8) || || 48,515 || 60-65
|- align="center" bgcolor="bbffbb"
| 126 || August 20 || 7:05pm || Red Sox || 11 – 6 || Waters (2-0) || Buchholz (2-9) || || 33,364 || 61-65
|- align="center" bgcolor="ffbbbb"
| 127 || August 22 || 7:05pm || Yankees || 9 – 4 || Veras (4-2) || Walker (1-1) || Rivera (29) || 45,543 || 61-66
|- align="center" bgcolor="ffbbbb"
| 128 || August 23 || 7:05pm || Yankees || 5 – 3 || Pavano (1-0) || Guthrie (10-10) || Rivera (30) || 48,817 || 61-67
|- align="center" bgcolor="ffbbbb"
| 129 || August 24 || 1:35pm || Yankees || 8 – 7 || E. Ramírez (4-1) || Walker (1-2) || Rivera (31) || || 61-68
|- align="center" bgcolor="bbffbb"
| 130 || August 25 || 6:05pm || White Sox || 4 – 3 (14) || Castillo (1-0) || H. Ramírez (0-1) || Cherry (1) || 17,367 || 62-68
|- align="center" bgcolor="ffbbbb"
| 131 || August 25 || 7:05pm || White Sox || 4 – 3 || Richard (2-2) || Waters (2-1) || Jenks (26) || 20,707 || 62-69
|- align="center" bgcolor="ffbbbb"
| 132 || August 26 || 7:05pm || White Sox || 8 – 3 || Floyd (14-6)|| Burres (7-8) || || 15,398 || 62-70
|- align="center" bgcolor="bbffbb"
| 133 || August 27 || 7:05pm || White Sox || 11 – 3 || Liz (5-3) || Danks (10-7) || || 15,736 || 63-70
|- align="center" bgcolor="ffbbbb"
| 134 || August 29 || 7:10pm || @ Rays || 14 – 3 || Kazmir (10-6) || Guthrie (10-11) || || 21,439 || 63-71
|- align="center" bgcolor="ffbbbb"
| 135 || August 30 || 7:10pm || @ Rays || 10 – 9 || Wheeler (3-5) || Cherry (0-2) || || 34,805 || 63-72
|- align="center" bgcolor="ffbbbb"
| 136 || August 31 || 1:40pm || @ Rays || 10 – 4 || Shields (12-8) || Burres (7-9) || || 32,379 || 63-73
|-

|- align="center" bgcolor="ffbbbb"
| 137 || September 1 || 7:05pm || @ Red Sox || 7 – 4 || Byrd (10-11) || Olson (8-7) || Papelbon (35) || 37,565 || 63-74
|- align="center" bgcolor="ffbbbb"
| 138 || September 2 || 7:05pm || @ Red Sox || 14 – 2 || Lester (13-5) || Liz (5-4) || || 37,710 || 63-75
|- align="center" bgcolor="ffbbbb"
| 139 || September 3 || 1:35pm || @ Red Sox || 5 – 4 || Masterson (5-4) || Miller (0-1) || || 37,373 || 63-76
|- align="center" bgcolor="ffbbbb"
| 140 || September 5 || 7:05pm || Athletics || 11 – 2 || Braden (5-3) || Waters (2-2) || || 14,984 || 63-77
|- align="center" bgcolor="bbbbbb"
| – || September 6 || 1:35pm || Athletics || colspan=6|Postponed (rain) Will not be made up 
|- align="center" bgcolor="ffbbbb"
| 141 || September 6 || 7:05pm || Athletics || 5 – 1 || G. Smith (7-14) || Cabrera (8-9) || || 21,553 || 63-78
|- align="center" bgcolor="bbffbb"
| 142 || September 8 || 7:05pm || Indians || 14 – 3 || Olson (9-7) || Carmona (8-6) || || 11,181 || 64-78
|- align="center" bgcolor="ffbbbb"
| 143 || September 9 || 7:05pm || Indians || 6 – 1 || Sowers (3-8) || Liz (5-5) || || 14,900 || 64-79
|- align="center" bgcolor="ffbbbb"
| 144 || September 10 || 7:05pm || Indians || 7 – 1 || Lewis (7-1) || Waters (2-3) || || 12,438 || 64-80
|- align="center" bgcolor="bbffbb"
| 145 || September 11 || 7:05pm || Indians || 6 – 3 || Cormier (3-3) || Jackson (0-3) || Miller (1) || 12,526 || 65-80
|- align="center" bgcolor="bbbbbb"
| – || September 12 || 7:05pm || Twins || colspan=6|Postponed (rain) Rescheduled for Sep 13 
|- align="center" bgcolor="ffbbbb"
| 146 || September 13 || 1:05pm || Twins || 12 – 2 || Baker (9-4) || Cabrera (8-10) || || 21,712 || 65-81
|- align="center" bgcolor="ffbbbb"
| 147 || September 13 || 7:05pm || Twins || 12 – 6 || Korecky (2-0) || Olson (9-8) || || 21,712 || 65-82
|- align="center" bgcolor="bbffbb"
| 148 || September 14 || 1:35pm || Twins || 7 – 3 || Liz (6-5) || Blackburn (10-9) || || 18,559 || 66-82
|- align="center" bgcolor="bbffbb"
| 149 || September 16 || 7:07pm || @ Blue Jays || 2 – 0 || Waters (3-3) || Marcum (9-7) || || 25,746 || 67-82
|- align="center" bgcolor="ffbbbb"
| 150 || September 17 || 7:07pm || @ Blue Jays || 8 – 7 || Carlson (7-1) || Mickolio (0-1) || Ryan (30) || 24,546 || 67-83
|- align="center" bgcolor="ffbbbb"
| 151 || September 18 || 7:07pm || @ Blue Jays || 3 – 2 || Litsch (12-8) || Olson (9-9) || Ryan (31) || 29,063 || 67-84
|- align="center" bgcolor="ffbbbb"
| 152 || September 19 || 7:05pm || @ Yankees || 3 – 2 || Pavano (4-1) || Liz (6-6) || M. Rivera (37) || 54,136|| 67-85
|- align="center" bgcolor="ffbbbb"
| 153 || September 20 || 1:05pm || @ Yankees || 1 – 0 || M. Rivera (6-5) || Miller (0-2) || || 54,662 || 67-86
|- align="center" bgcolor="ffbbbb"
| 154 || September 21 || 8:05pm || @ Yankees || 7 – 3 || Pettitte (14-14) || Waters (3-4) || || 54,610 || 67-87
|- align="center" bgcolor="ffbbbb"
| 155 || September 22 || 5:05pm || Rays || 4 – 2 || Balfour (6-2) || Cherry (0-3) || Wheeler (12) || 12,489 || 67-88
|- align="center" bgcolor="ffbbbb"
| 156 || September 23 || 1:05pm || Rays || 5 – 2 || Shields (14-8) || Olson (9-10) || Wheeler (13) || 15,215 || 67-89
|- align="center" bgcolor="ffbbbb"
| 157 || September 23 || 7:05pm || Rays || 7 – 5 || Niemann (2-1) || Walker (1-3) || Howell (3) || 15,215 || 67-90
|- align="center" bgcolor="ffbbbb"
| 158 || September 24 || 7:05pm || Rays || 11 – 6 || Jackson (13-11) || Burres (7-10) || Miller (2) || 13,632 || 67-91
|- align="center" bgcolor="ffbbbb"
| 159 || September 26 || 7:05pm || Blue Jays || 3 – 0 || Richmond (1-3) || Waters (3-5) || || 17,716 || 67-92
|- align="center" bgcolor="bbffbb"
| 160 || September 27 || 7:05pm || Blue Jays || 2 – 1 (7)|| Bass (4-4) || Parrish (1-1) || || 18,378 || 68-92
|- align="center" bgcolor="ffbbbb"
| 161 || September 28 || 1:35pm || Blue Jays || 10 – 1 || Litsch (13-9) || Guthrie (10-12) || || 19,554 || 68-93
|-

Player stats

Batting

Starters by position
Note: Pos = Position; G = Games played; AB = At bats; H = Hits; Avg. = Batting average; HR = Home runs; RBI = Runs batted in

Other batters
Note: G = Games played; AB = At bats; H = Hits; Avg. = Batting average; HR = Home runs; RBI = Runs batted in

Pitching

Starting pitchers
Note: G = Games pitched; IP = Innings pitched; W = Wins; L = Losses; ERA = Earned run average; SO = Strikeouts

Other pitchers
Note: G = Games pitched; IP = Innings pitched; W = Wins; L = Losses; ERA = Earned run average; SO = Strikeouts

Relief pitchers
Note: G = Games pitched; W = Wins; L = Losses; SV = Saves; ERA = Earned run average; SO = Strikeouts

Farm system

References

Game Logs:
1st Half: Baltimore Orioles Game Log on ESPN.com
2nd Half: Baltimore Orioles Game Log on ESPN.com
Batting Statistics: Baltimore Orioles Batting Stats on ESPN.com
Pitching Statistics: Baltimore Orioles Pitching Stats on ESPN.com

2008 Baltimore Orioles at Baseball-Reference.com

Baltimore Orioles seasons
Baltimore Orioles
Baltimore